Pippo Delbono (born June 1, 1959 in Varazze, Italy) is an Italian author, actor, and director.

Biography 

Pippo Delbono began training in traditional theatre in Denmark, studying the principles of oriental theatre, through a rigorous work on body and voice. Later, in Germany, Delbono was invited by Pina Bausch to follow her work. At the beginning of the 80's he founded the Compagnia Pippo Delbono, creating most of his works with them, from Il Tempo degli Assassini (1987) to La Gioia (2018).

He does not stage plays but, rather, total creations, devised with a stable group of actors whose number has grown through the years. The encounter with socially marginalized people determines a turning point in his poetical research: that's how Barboni (1997) was born.  Some of these actors – among them Bobò, deaf-mute, who had been kept in an asylum in Aversa, near Naples, for forty-five years and recently died – have kept working with the company and are still a central part of this experience.

The works that followed — La rabbia dedicated to Pasolini, Guerra, Esodo, Gente di plastica, Racconti di giugno, Urlo, Il silenzio, Questo buio feroce, La menzogna, Dopo la battaglia, Orchidee, Vangelo, La gioia — like the ones before, have been performed worldwide in more than fifty countries, in theaters and festivals, including the Festival d'Avignon (where a lot of the company's creations were presented), Barcelona's Grec, Theater Spektakel in Zurich, Festwochen in Wien, Festival TransAmeriques in Montreal, Venice Biennale, etc.

In 2009, he was awarded the Europe Prize Theatrical Realities, in Wrocław.

Several theatres, including the Théâtre du Rond-Point in Paris, Piccolo Teatro in Milan, Teatro Argentina in Rome, among others, present regularly his performances. Henry V — his only creation based on an existing play – is the only Italian production of Shakespeare that has ever been invited to perform at the Royal Shakespeare Company. His production Vangelo (2016) has been realized at Croatian National Theatre in Zagreb with actors of his company together with Croatian actors, dancers, musicians and chorus and with refugees of the PIAM refugee camp in Asti (Italy). The performance has two versions: Opera with chorus and orchestra, that premiered in Italy at Teatro Comunale in Bologna, and Drama version, that premiered at Thèatre Vidy – Lausanne. The music of the performance are by Enzo Avitabile who won the Ubu Prize for them.  His last theatre creation, La gioia, premiered in March 2018 and has been presented at Theatre Olympics in Delhi and Bhopal (India), at Hong Kong Arts Festival, in Shizuoka (Japan), in Tunisia, Spain, Portugal. and it will be on tour in the theatrical season 2021/2022.

Europe Theatre Prize 
In 2009, he was one of the recipients of the XI Europe Prize Theatrical Realities. The prize organization described Delbono as a "poet of social marginalisation and diversity" and stated that he "has always seen art as a fundamental experience for overcoming desperation".

Theatre

Opera
 Studio per Obra Maestra at Teatro Lirico Sperimentale Spoleto (2007)
 Cavalleria Rusticana by Pietro Mascagni at Teatro di San Carlo Naples (2012)
 Don Giovanni by Wolfgang Amadeus Mozart at Grand Theatre, Poznań (2014)
 Madama Butterfly by Giacomo Puccini at Teatro di San Carlo Naples (2014 and 2016)
 St John Passion by Johann Sebastian Bach at Teatro Massimo Palermo
 Pagliacci by Ruggero Leoncavallo at Teatro dell'Opera di Roma (2018)

Awards 
 1997 – Premio Ubu
Special Prize for Barboni
 1998 – Italian Critic's Award
for Guerra
 2003 – Le Maschere Awards
for Gente di Plastica
 2004 – David di Donatello
Best Documentary for Guerra
 2005 – Le Maschere Awards
for Urlo
 2009 – Europe Theatre Prize - Europe Prize Theatrical Realities
 2010 – Festival international du court métrage de Clermont-Ferrand
Grand Prix Compétition Internationale for Blue Sofa
 2011 – Premio Ubu
Best Show for Dopo la Battaglia
 2012 – Premio Abbiati
 2012 – Prix spécial du Jury SSR – Festival Vision du réél Nyon
for Amore e Carne
 2013 – Don Quijote Prize at Locarno Festival
for Sangue
 2013 – Special Mention Doclisboa
for Sangue
 2014 – San Giò Video Festival
Best Movie for Sangue
 2016 – Festival del Cinema del Reale Award
Best Actors Pippo Delbono and Bobò
 2016 – Grand Prix du Festival Doc en courts de Lyon
for La Visite
 2016 – It's All True – International Documentary Film Festival San Paulo

Best Short Film for La Visite

Filmography

Director 
 Guerra (2003)
 Grido (2006)
 Blue Sofa (2009) short film
 La paura (2009)
 Amore carne (2011)
 Sangue (2013)
 La Visite (2015)
 Vangelo (2016)

Actor

Exhibits 
 Ma mère et les autres, La Maison Rouge, Paris (2014)
 L’Esprit qui ment, Centre Pompidou, Paris (2018)

Concerts 
 Amore e carne, with Alexander Balanescu (2011)
 Il sangue, with Petra Magoni and Ilaria Fantin, inspired by Sophocles's Oedipus at Colonus (2013)
 La notte, with Piero Corso, inspired by Bernard-Marie Koltès's La Nuit juste avant les forêts (2014)
 Bestemmia d'amore, with Enzo Avitabile (2014)

Bibliography
 Ghiglione A., Barboni. Il teatro di Pippo Delbono, Ubulibri, Milan, Italy 1999
 Delbono P., Pippo Delbono, mon théâtre, Actes Sud, Arles, France 2004
 Delbono P., Pons H., Le Corps de l'acteur, six entretiens romains avec Hervé Pons, Éditions Les Solitaires Intempestifs, Besançon, France, 2004
 Delbono P., El Teatro de la rabia, Punto a parte, Murcia, Spain, 2005
 Delbono P., Racconti di giugno, Garzanti, Milan, Italy, 2008
 Bentivoglio L., Pippo Delbono.Corpi senza menzogna, Barbés, 2009
 Delbono P., Regards, Actes Sud, Arles, France, 2010
 Bionda N., Gualdoni C., Visioni incrociate. Pippo Delbono tra cinema e teatro Titivillus, Corazzano, Italy, 2011
 Delbono P., Dopo la battaglia. Scritti poetico-politici, Ed. Barbés, 2011
 De Martino A., Puppa p., Toninato P., Differences on stage, Cambridge Scholar Publishing, Newcastle upon Tyne, UK, 2013
 Pizzinant B., Pippo Delbono, le théâtre au temps des assassins, Editions de l'Amandier, Paris, France, 2014
 Delbono P., Pier Paolo Pasolini. Urlare la verità, Clichy, Florence, Italy, 2014
 Delbono P., Senzani G., Sangue. Dialogo tra un artista buddista e un ex terrorista tornato in libertà, Clichy, Florence, Italy, 2014
 Delbono P., David Bowie. L'uomo che cadde sulla terra, Clichy, Florence, Italy, 2016
 Manzella G., La possibilità della gioia, Clichy, Florence, Italy, 2017
 Delbono P., Le don de soi, Actes Sud, Arles, France, 2018

References

Writers from Liguria
1959 births
Living people